Brett Eppehimer (born May 28, 1976, in Pottstown, Pennsylvania) is an American-Italian former NCAA Division I and professional basketball player.

College career
Eppehimer attended Lehigh University (1995–1999), in Bethlehem, Pennsylvania, where he played NCAA Division I basketball and finished with 1,742 career points.  The point guard/shooting guard averaged over 20 points per game, in three different seasons, and led the Patriot League in scoring twice.  In 1998, Eppehimer finished as the 4th leading scorer in college basketball, averaging 24.7 points per game.

Professional career
Following university, Eppehimer signed in Europe, with Braunschweig of the German Basketball Bundesliga.  During his first professional season, he averaged 20.7 points and 6.2 assists per game, both top-10 in the league. Eppehimer (a dual citizen of the United States and Italy) earned All-Bosman 1st team, awarded to the best European players in Germany.

Eppehimer played another seven seasons professionally.  The clubs he played for included: Tenerife CB (Tenerife, Spain), London Towers (London, England) of the BBL and EuroLeague, Ilysiakos Athens (Athens, Greece), CB Los Barrios (Los Barrios, Spain), Sicilia Messina (Messina, Italy), Legea Scafati (Scafati, Italy), and the Polynorm Giants in Bergen-op-Zoom, Netherlands.

Personal
Eppehimer is the older brother of professional basketball player Nick Eppehimer.

References

External links
 Euroleague.net Profile
 Eurobasket.com Profile
 Italian League Profile 

1976 births
Living people
American expatriate basketball people in Germany
American expatriate basketball people in Greece
American expatriate basketball people in Italy
American expatriate basketball people in Spain
American expatriate basketball people in the Netherlands
American expatriate basketball people in the United Kingdom
Ilysiakos B.C. players
Italian men's basketball players
Lehigh Mountain Hawks men's basketball players
People from Pottstown, Pennsylvania
Point guards
The Hill School alumni
Sportspeople from Montgomery County, Pennsylvania
American men's basketball players